Apodemia mejicanus, the Mexican metalmark or Sonoran metalmark, is a species of butterfly in the family Riodinidae (the metalmarks). It was first described by Hans Hermann Behr in 1865. It is found in North America.

Subspecies
Three subspecies belong to Apodemia mejicanus:
 Apodemia mejicanus deserti Barnes & McDunnough, 1918 i
 Apodemia mejicanus mejicanus (Behr, 1865) i b
 Apodemia mejicanus pueblo Scott, 1998 i b
Data sources: i = ITIS, c = Catalogue of Life, g = GBIF, b = BugGuide

References

Further reading

External links

 

Apodemia
Articles created by Qbugbot
Butterflies described in 1865